Jean-Jacques Enderle (9 January 1920 – 24 April 1976) was a Belgian field hockey player. He competed at the 1948 Summer Olympics, the 1952 Summer Olympics and the 1956 Summer Olympics.

References

External links
 

1920 births
1976 deaths
Belgian male field hockey players
Olympic field hockey players of Belgium
Field hockey players at the 1948 Summer Olympics
Field hockey players at the 1952 Summer Olympics
Field hockey players at the 1956 Summer Olympics
Field hockey players from Brussels